Martijn Berden (born 29 July 1997) is a Dutch professional footballer who plays for VVV-Venlo on loan from Go Ahead Eagles as a winger.

Club career
Berden made his professional debut as Jong PSV player in the second division on 18 September 2015 against Sparta Rotterdam. He replaced Moussa Sanoh after 65 minutes. After spell with PSV, Berden returned to Vitesse in July 2016.

On 31 January 2023, Berden joined VVV-Venlo in Eerste Divisie on loan until the end of the season, with an option to buy.

References

1997 births
Living people
Footballers from The Hague
Association football forwards
Dutch footballers
Netherlands youth international footballers
Jong PSV players
SBV Vitesse players
Go Ahead Eagles players
VVV-Venlo players
Eredivisie players
Eerste Divisie players
Tweede Divisie players